Hrayesh chy ne hrayesh? (Граєш чи не граєш?), the Ukrainian version of the Deal or No Deal format, airs on Ukraina. The host is Dmitriy Shepelev and the grand prize is ₴1,000,000. It premiered on March 7, 2010 and is broadcast as a Sunday prime time show.

There are 26 cases, containing prizes from ₴1,000,000 to ₴0.01.

Case Values

References

Website

Deal or No Deal
2010s Ukrainian television series debuts
2010s Ukrainian television series endings
Ukraine (TV channel) original programming